Club Deportivo Burguillos is a Spanish football team based in Burguillos del Cerro, in the autonomous community of Extremadura. Founded in 1963, it plays in Primera Regional, holding home games at Estadio Municipal Los Centenales.

Season to season

12 seasons in Tercera División

External links
official website
Futbolme.com profile
fexfutbol.com profile

Football clubs in Extremadura
Association football clubs established in 1963
Divisiones Regionales de Fútbol clubs
1963 establishments in Spain
Province of Badajoz

es:Club Deportivo Burguillos